BYOI may refer to:
 A four letter ICAO Airport Code (currently unassigned)
 Bring your own Infrastructure 
 Bring Your Own Iron
 Bring Your Own Improv, a shortform improvisational comedy troupe based in Providence, RI, USA
 Bring Your Own Interface
 Bring Your Own Identity
 Bring Your Own Isot